Cake Boss is an American reality television series, which originally aired on the cable television network TLC from April 19, 2009 to December 2, 2017. New episodes returned on May 18, 2019, with the show moving to TLC's sister network, Discovery Family until April 11, 2020.

During the course of the series, 247 episodes of Cake Boss aired over nine seasons.

Series overview

Episodes

Season 1 (2009)

Season 2 (2009–10)

Season 3 (2010)

Season 4 (2011–12)

Season 5 (2012–13)

Season 6 (2013–14)

Season 7 (2015)

Season 8 (2016–17)

Season 9 (2019–20)

References

General references 

 
 
 
 

Episodes
Lists of American non-fiction television series episodes
Lists of American reality television series episodes
Lists of food television series episodes